The winners and nominees of the Asia Pacific Screen Award for Best Youth Feature Film are

2000's

2010's

External links

Children's Feature Film
Lists of films by award